Al Qadisiyya is a 1981 Iraqi drama film directed by Salah Abu Seif. It was entered into the 12th Moscow International Film Festival. The historical film was produced in tandem with Egypt and with Iraq’s Cinema and Theatre Department.

Plot
The film portrays the Battle of al-Qadisiyyah, in which the Islamic army of Sa'd ibn Abi Waqqas (after the death beforehand of Al-Muthanna ibn Haritha) definitively ended the Sassanid Empire by defeating the Persian forces of Rostam Farrokhzad.

Cast
 Soad Hosny
 Ezzat El Alaili (as Sohrab)
 Shetha Salim
 Laila Taher
 Mohamed Hassan Al Joundi (as Rustam)
 Mohamed Almansour
 Omar Khalfah
 Sa'dia Zeidi

Production
The cost of production was estimated at 4 million Iraqi dinars, at the time equivalent to 15 million dollars. It was the most expensive Arab film production in history at the time.

References

External links
 
 

1980s historical adventure films
1980s historical drama films
1981 films
1981 drama films
Egyptian historical films
Iraqi drama films
1980s Arabic-language films
Films directed by Salah Abu Seif
Films set in the Arabian Peninsula
Films set in the 7th century